"Force et honneur" is a song by French rapper Nessbeal, and produced by the Trak Invaders. It was released on 16 August 2011 as the second single from his fourth studio album Sélection naturelle.

Music video
A music video for the song was released on Nessbeal's VEVO channel on YouTube on 10 November 2011.

Track listing
 Digital download
 "Force et honneur" – 3:32

Chart performance

References

2011 singles
2011 songs
Nessbeal songs
French hip hop songs
7th Magnitude singles